228th Brigade may refer to:

 228th Mixed Brigade (Spain)
 228th Brigade, Royal Field Artillery
 228th Infantry Brigade (United Kingdom)